The Northern Avenue Petroglyph Site, in Kingman, Arizona, is a  archeological site that was listed on the U.S. National Register of Historic Places in 1996.  It has also been known as "AZ F;12:22(ASM)".  It served as a ceremonial site and an animal facility, in prehistory.

Its location is not disclosed by the National Register, presumably towards protecting its potential to yield future information.  However it has been stated by a local petroglyphs club to be located with the Kingman town limits.

References 

Archaeological sites on the National Register of Historic Places in Arizona
Geography of Mohave County, Arizona
Kingman, Arizona
Petroglyphs in Arizona
National Register of Historic Places in Kingman, Arizona